Jana Begum was a Mughal Indian noblewoman and scholar, noted for being one of the first women to write a commentary (Arabic: tafsir) on the Qur'an in the 17th century.  She was the daughter of Abdul Rahim Khan-i-Khanan, a scholar and general under Mughal Emperor Akbar. Her grandfather was Bairam Khan, another general under Mughal Emperors Humayun and Akbar. Bairam Khan had also served as Regent to Akbar. Jana Begum later went on to marry Daniyal Mirza, a son of Akbar making her the Mughal Emperor's daughter-in-law. Akbar had also married Bairam Khan's widow Salima Sultan Begum hence Salima not only was step-grandmother to Jana, but also step-mother-in-law.

References

Women of the Mughal Empire
Mughal nobility
17th-century Muslim scholars of Islam
Quranic exegesis scholars
Islam in South Asia
17th-century Indian women writers
17th-century Indian writers
Year of birth missing
Year of death missing
Women scholars of Islam